"Sultans of Swing" is a song by British rock band Dire Straits, written by lead vocalist Mark Knopfler. The demo of the song was recorded at Pathway Studios, North London, in July 1977 and quickly acquired a following after it was put in rotation on BBC Radio London. Its popularity soon reached record executives, and Dire Straits were offered a contract with Phonogram Records. The song was then re-recorded in February 1978 at Basing Street Studios for the band's eponymous debut album.

The B-side, "Eastbound Train", is a live track that otherwise only appears on the Live at the Hope & Anchor Front Row Festival album. The single would go on to reach the top 5 in Canada, South Africa, and the United States as well as the top 10 in Australia, Ireland, and the United Kingdom.

The song has since largely remained a staple of classic rock radio, and is one of the band's most recognizable songs.

Background and composition
"Sultans of Swing" was composed by Mark Knopfler on a National Steel guitar in open tuning. He thought the song was "dull" until he bought his first Stratocaster in 1977: "It just came alive as soon as I played it on that '61 Strat ... the new chord changes just presented themselves and fell into place."

The lyrics were inspired by a performance of a jazz band playing in the corner of an almost empty pub in Deptford, South London. At the end of their performance, the lead singer announced their name, the Sultans of Swing; Knopfler found the contrast between the group's dowdy appearance and surroundings and their grandiose name amusing. 

The song is set in common time, with a tempo of 149 beats per minute. It is in the key of D minor with Knopfler's vocal range spanning G2 to D4. It uses a chord progression of Dm–C–B–A for the verses, and F–C–B for the choruses. The riff uses triads, particularly second inversions. The song employs the Andalusian cadence or diatonic phrygian tetrachord. All the chords are compatible with a D natural minor scale, except for the A major triad, which suggests a D harmonic minor scale. Knopfler used similar triads on "Lady Writer".

Recording
Shortly after Dire Straits formed in 1977, they recorded a five-song demo tape at Pathway Studios, including "Sultans of Swing". They took the tape to the influential DJ Charlie Gillett, presenter of Honky Tonk on BBC Radio London, hoping for advice. Gillett liked the music and put "Sultans of Swing" on his rotation. Two months later, Dire Straits signed a recording contract with Phonogram Records.

"Sultans of Swing" was re-recorded in February 1978 at Basing Street Studios for the debut album Dire Straits, produced by Muff Winwood. Knopfler used the guitar technique of finger picking on the recording.

Critical reception
Ken Tucker of Rolling Stone singled out "Sultans of Swing" as a highlight of the album for its "inescapable hook" and compared Knopfler's vocal stylings to those of Bob Dylan.  Cash Box said that "the phrasing of the vocals is reminiscent of Lou Reed" and that "the arrangement of moderate beat and excellent guitar work are exceptionally fluid and engaging."  Record World said that "The lyrics are thoughtful and the hook instantly memorable." The New Rolling Stone Album Guide called the song "an insinuating bit of bar-band mythmaking" whose lyrics "paint a vivid picture of an overlooked and underappreciated pub combo". The Spokane Chronicle's Jim Kershner wrote that "Sultans of Swing" is "remarkable, both for its lyrics that made fun of hip young Londoners and the phenomenal guitar sound of Knopfler", which "sounded like no other guitar on radio". Jon Marlowe of The Palm Beach Post called it "an infectious, sounds-damn-good-on-the-car-radio ode to every bar band who has ever done four sets a night, seven nights a week".  Classic Rock critic Paul Rees rated the live version on Alchemy to be Dire Straits' greatest song.

Writing in 2013 on the impact of the song, Rick Moore of American Songwriter reflected:

Record Mirror named "Sultans of Swing" the tenth-best song of 1978. In 1992, Life named it one of the top five songs of 1979. In 1993, Paul Williams included it in his book Rock and Roll: The 100 Best Singles. The song is on The Rock and Roll Hall of Fame's 500 Songs that Shaped Rock and Roll list, Dire Straits' only appearance. In 2006, Mojo included it in a list of the 50 best British songs. Guitar World ranked its guitar solo at the 22nd greatest, and Rolling Stone named it the 32nd greatest guitar song.

Chart performance
The song was originally released in May 1978, but it did not chart at the time. Following its re-issue in January 1979, the song entered the American music pop chart. Unusually, the success of this single release came more than six months after the relatively unheralded release of the band's debut album in October 1978. BBC Radio was initially unwilling to play the song due to its high lyrical content but after it became a U.S. hit, their line softened. The song reached the top 10 in both the UK and the U.S., reaching No. 8 on the UK Singles Chart and No. 4 on the Billboard Hot 100 and helped drive sales of the album, which also became a hit.

"Sultans of Swing" was re-issued again as a single in November 1988, a month after it appeared on the band's greatest hits album Money for Nothing, when it peaked at No. 62. It was also included on Sultans of Swing: The Very Best of Dire Straits and The Best of Dire Straits & Mark Knopfler: Private Investigations.

Other versions
Knopfler has improvised and expanded the solo during live performances. The coda of the live recording on the 1984 album Alchemy stretches the song to nearly 11 minutes.

Charts

Certifications

Notes

References

External links
Guitar World: 100 Greatest Guitar Solos - Sultans of Swing

1977 songs
1978 debut singles
1979 singles
Dire Straits songs
Songs written by Mark Knopfler
Vertigo Records singles
Warner Records singles
Song recordings produced by Muff Winwood
Eric Clapton songs
Songs about music
Pub rock (United Kingdom) songs